, also  or , is a Japanese term for individuals or persons who may feel disconnected or dissociated from the people around them. They may entertain wild fantasies and persecutory delusions or other strong beliefs, and their speech or actions may seem strange or incoherent to outside observers. "Denpa" literally means "electromagnetic wave", and the original sense of denpa-san was of someone who thought they were receiving voices, thoughts, or instructions directly to their mind via electromagnetic radiation. It is often used as a term to describe a subgenre of horror in anime, manga, Japanese visual novels, such as Chaos;Head, and Ultimate Otaku Teacher, as well as light novels such as Ground Control to Psychoelectric Girl and Denpa teki na Kanojo that share characteristics with this term.

The term was originally tied to the Fukagawa series of killings in 1981, in which a man killed four people (women and children) due to paranoia and resentment of his employers. The man later claimed to be influenced by radio waves, saying that they caused him to commit the murders.

Denpa media 
Denpa media, such as manga, anime and games are characterized by socially disconnected individuals featured in mundane environments, which often leads to odd or unfamiliar attitudes. The genre typically features common imagery of technology that use electromagnetic or radio waves to function, such as antennas and telephone poles, and often features themes of paranoia, anxiety, trauma, depression, suicide and urban or suburban living.

Although mostly associated with horror, the genre can exist in drama, action or thriller stories (with notable examples being Neon Genesis Evangelion, Serial Experiments Lain, Boogiepop Phantom and Aku no Hana). The genre is also heavily associated with otaku cultural influence, with works referencing otaku media.

Shizuku and Paranoia Agent are often credited as popularizing the genre.

See also 
 Denpa song
 Electromagnetic hypersensitivity
 Electronic harassment
 Hallucination
 Jouhatsu
 On the Origin of the "Influencing Machine" in Schizophrenia
 Psychological fiction
 Schizophrenia
 Thought broadcasting
 Thought insertion
 Tin foil hat
 Vaporwave

References

Japanese popular culture
Anime and manga terminology
Horror fiction
Horror anime and manga
Psychological fiction
Behavioral addiction
Mass psychogenic illness